Muhammad Habibar Rahman (1923-1971) was a Bengali intellectual who was killed in the Bangladesh Liberation war and is considered a martyr in Bangladesh.

Early life
Rahman was born in Baliadhar, Noakhali District, East Bengal, British India on 1 January 1923. He finished his SSC from Dattapara High School in 1938 and HSC from Calcutta Islamia College in 1940. He finished his undergraduate studies in mathematics from Presidency College in Kolkata. He completed his Masters in mathematics from the Aligarh University.

Career
He joined Dhaka College as a professor of mathematics in 1946. In 1951 he received government funding to study in Cambridge University in the United Kingdom. He graduated from Cambridge in 1953 after finishing the Tripos in mathematics. He worked in Presidency College in Kolkata before joining Rajshahi University in 1954. He joined as a professor of mathematics and by in 1958 had been promoted to reader. In 1962 he pursued higher studies in applied mathematics in the United States. From 1964 to 1966 he served as the chairman of the Department of Mathematics at Rajshahi University. From 1967 to 1970 he served as the provost of Ameer Ali Hall of Rajshahi University after which returned to being the chairman of the Department of Mathematics. He was a member of the Dhaka Rationalist club.

Death
The Pakistan Army on 15 April 1971 captured him from his home in front of his family and he never came back, is presumed to be dead. Rajshahi University named Shaheed Habibur Rahman Hall after him.  The dorm has a bust of him in its entrance. He was also awarded with "Ekushey Padak" (Lit: TwentyFirst Award) second highest civilian award in Bangladesh.

References

1923 births
1971 deaths
People killed in the Bangladesh Liberation War
Bangladeshi mathematicians
Academic staff of the University of Rajshahi
Alumni of the University of Cambridge
Aligarh Muslim University alumni
People from Noakhali District
Maulana Azad College alumni
Presidency University, Kolkata alumni